Valerie Loker (born May 1, 1980) is a Canadian badminton player. She won a silver medal, along with her partner Mike Beres in the mixed doubles at the 2007 Pan American Games in Rio de Janeiro, Brazil, against the winning U.S. pair Howard Bach and Eva Lee, with a score of 18–21 and 17–21. Loker is also a member of Club Excellence Yonex Laval in Montreal, Quebec, and is coached and trained by Jean-Paul Girard.

Loker qualified for the mixed doubles at the 2008 Summer Olympics in Beijing, by placing fifteenth and receiving an allocated spot from the Badminton World Federation's ranking list. Playing with three-time Olympian Beres, Loker lost the preliminary round match to Thai pair Sudket Prapakamol and Saralee Thungthongkam, with a score of 9–21 each in two straight periods.

References

External links
 
 
 
 
 
 
 
 NBC Olympics profile

1980 births
Living people
Badminton players at the 2006 Commonwealth Games
Badminton players at the 2007 Pan American Games
Badminton players at the 2008 Summer Olympics
Canadian female badminton players
Commonwealth Games competitors for Canada
Medalists at the 2007 Pan American Games
Olympic badminton players of Canada
Pan American Games medalists in badminton
Pan American Games silver medalists for Canada
Sportspeople from Brantford
20th-century Canadian women
21st-century Canadian women